Sotoyama Dam  is a gravity dam located in Iwate Prefecture in Japan. The dam is used for power production. The catchment area of the dam is 32.7 km2. The dam impounds about 49  ha of land when full and can store 3751 thousand cubic meters of water. The construction of the dam was started on 1941 and completed in 1943.

See also
List of dams in Japan

References

Dams in Iwate Prefecture